In Japanese history, the  is the time between  14,000–300 BCE, during which Japan was inhabited by a diverse hunter-gatherer and early agriculturalist population united through a common Jōmon culture, which reached a considerable degree of sedentism and cultural complexity. The name "cord-marked" was first applied by the American zoologist and orientalist Edward S. Morse, who discovered sherds of pottery in 1877 and subsequently translated it into Japanese as Jōmon. The pottery style characteristic of the first phases of Jōmon culture was decorated by impressing cords into the surface of wet clay and is generally accepted to be among the oldest in the world.

The Jōmon period was rich in tools and jewelry made from bone, stone, shell and antler; pottery figurines and vessels; and lacquerware. It is often compared to pre-Columbian cultures of the North American Pacific Northwest and especially to the Valdivia culture in Ecuador because in these settings cultural complexity developed within a primarily hunting-gathering context with limited use of horticulture.

Chronology 
The approximately 14,000 year Jōmon period is conventionally divided into several phases: Incipient (13,750-8,500 BCE), Initial (8,500–5,000), Early (5,000–3,520), Middle (3,520–2,470), Late (2,470–1,250), and Final (1,250–500), with each phase progressively shorter than the prior phase. The fact that this entire period is given the same name by archaeologists should not be taken to mean that there was not considerable regional and temporal diversity; the time between the earliest Jōmon pottery and that of the more well-known Middle Jōmon period is about twice as long as the span separating the building of the Great Pyramid of Giza from the 21st century.

Dating of the Jōmon sub-phases is based primarily upon ceramic typology, and to a lesser extent radiocarbon dating.

Recent findings have refined the final phase of the Jōmon period to 300 BCE. The Yayoi period started between 500 and 300 BCE according to radio-carbon evidence, while Yayoi styled pottery was found in a Jōmon site of northern Kyushu already in 800 BCE.

Pottery 

The earliest pottery in Japan was made at or before the start of the Incipient Jōmon period. Pottery of roughly the same age was subsequently found at other sites such as in Kamikuroiwa and the Fukui cave.

Archaeologist Junko Habu claims "[t]he majority of Japanese scholars believed, and still believe, that pottery production was first invented in mainland Asia and subsequently introduced into the Japanese archipelago." This seems to be confirmed by recent archaeology. The pottery may have been used as cookware.

The first Jōmon pottery is characterized by the cord-marking that gives the period its name and has now been found in large numbers of sites. The pottery of the period has been classified by archaeologists into some 70 styles, with many more local varieties of the styles. The antiquity of Jōmon pottery was first identified after World War II, through radiocarbon dating methods. The earliest vessels were mostly smallish round-bottomed bowls 10–50 cm high that are assumed to have been used for boiling food and, perhaps, storing it beforehand. They belonged to hunter-gatherers and the size of the vessels may have been limited by a need for portability. As later bowls increase in size, this is taken to be a sign of an increasingly settled pattern of living. These types continued to develop, with increasingly elaborate patterns of decoration, undulating rims, and flat bottoms so that they could stand on a surface.

The manufacture of pottery typically implies some form of sedentary life because pottery is heavy, bulky, and fragile and thus generally unusable for hunter-gatherers. However, this does not seem to have been the case with the first Jōmon people, who perhaps numbered  over the whole archipelago. It seems that food sources were so abundant in the natural environment of the Japanese islands that they could support fairly large, semi-sedentary populations. The Jōmon people used chipped stone tools, ground stone tools, traps, and bows, and were evidently skillful coastal and deep-water fishers.

Chronological ceramic typology 
Incipient Jōmon 
Linear applique
Nail impression
Cord impression
Muroya lower

Initial Jōmon (7500–4000 BCE)
Igusa
Inaridai
Mito
Lower Tado
Upper Tado
Shiboguchi
Kayama

Incipient and Initial Jōmon 

Traces of Paleolithic culture, mainly stone tools, occur in Japan from around  onwards. The earliest "Incipient Jōmon" phase began while Japan was still linked to continental Asia as a narrow peninsula. The main connection between the Japanese archipelago and Mainland Asia was through the Korean Peninsula to Kyushu and Honshu. In addition, Luzon, Taiwan, Ryukyu, and Kyushu constitute a continuous chain of islands, connecting the Jōmon with Southeast Asia, while Honshu, Hokkaido and Sakhalin connected the Jōmon with Siberia.

Within the archipelago, the vegetation was transformed by the end of the Ice Age. In southwestern Honshu, Shikoku, and Kyushu, broadleaf evergreen trees dominated the forests, whereas broadleaf deciduous trees and conifers were common in northeastern Honshu and southern Hokkaido. Many native tree species, such as beeches, buckeyes, chestnuts, and oaks produced edible nuts and acorns. These provided substantial sources of food for both humans and animals.

In the northeast, the plentiful marine life carried south by the Oyashio Current, especially salmon, was another major food source. Settlements along both the Sea of Japan and the Pacific Ocean subsisted on immense amounts of shellfish, leaving distinctive middens (mounds of discarded shells and other refuse) that are now prized sources of information for archaeologists. Other food sources meriting special mention include Sika deer, wild boar (with possible wild-pig management), wild plants such as yam-like tubers, and freshwater fish. Supported by the highly productive deciduous forests and an abundance of seafood, the population was concentrated in Honshu and Kyushu, but Jōmon sites range from Hokkaido to the Ryukyu Islands. Tigers once existed in the Japanese archipelago, but they became extinct in prehistoric times.

Early Jōmon (5000–3520 BCE) 
The Early Jōmon period saw an explosion in population, as indicated by the number of larger aggregated villages from this period. This period occurred during the Holocene climatic optimum, when the local climate became warmer and more humid.

Early agriculture 

The degree to which horticulture or small-scale agriculture was practiced by Jōmon people is debated. Currently, there is no scientific consensus to support a conceptualization of Jōmon period culture as only hunter-gatherer. There is evidence to suggest that arboriculture was practiced in the form of tending groves of lacquer (Toxicodendron verniciflua) and nut (Castanea crenata and Aesculus turbinata) producing trees, as well as soybean, bottle gourd, hemp, Perilla, adzuki, among others. These characteristics place them somewhere in between hunting-gathering and agriculture.

An apparently domesticated variety of peach appeared very early at Jōmon sites in 6700–6400 BP (4700–4400 BCE). This was already similar to modern cultivated forms. This domesticated type of peach was apparently brought into Japan from China. Nevertheless, in China, itself, this variety is currently attested only at a later date of 5300–4300 BP.

Middle Jōmon (3520–2470 BCE) 

Highly ornate pottery dogū figurines and vessels, such as the so-called "flame style" vessels, and lacquered wood objects remain from that time. Although the ornamentation of pottery increased over time, the ceramic fabric always remained quite coarse. During this time Magatama stone beads make a transition from being a common jewelry item found in homes into serving as a grave good. This is a period where there are large burial mounds and monuments.

This period saw a rise in complexity in the design of pit-houses, the most commonly used method of housing at the time, with some even having paved stone floors. A study in 2015 found that this form of dwelling continued up until the Satsumon culture. Using archaeological data on pollen count, this phase is the warmest of all the phases. By the end of this phase the warm climate starts to enter a cooling trend.

Late and Final Jōmon (2470–500 BCE) 
After 1500 BCE, the climate cooled entering a stage of neoglaciation, and populations seem to have contracted dramatically. Comparatively few archaeological sites can be found after 1500 BCE.

The Japanese chestnut, Castanea crenata, becomes essential, not only as a nut bearing tree, but also because it was extremely durable in wet conditions and became the most used timber for building houses during the Late Jōmon phase.

During the Final Jōmon period, a slow shift was taking place in western Japan: steadily increasing contact with the Korean Peninsula eventually led to the establishment of Korean-type settlements in western Kyushu, beginning around 900 BCE. The settlers brought with them new technologies such as wet rice farming and bronze and iron metallurgy, as well as new pottery styles similar to those of the Mumun pottery period. The settlements of these new arrivals seem to have coexisted with those of the Jōmon and Yayoi for around a thousand years.

Outside Hokkaido, the Final Jōmon is succeeded by a new farming culture, the Yayoi (c. 300 BCE – 300 CE), named after an archaeological site near Tokyo.

Within Hokkaido, the Jōmon is succeeded by the Okhotsk culture and Zoku-Jōmon (post-Jōmon) or Epi-Jōmon culture, which later replaced or merged with the Satsumon culture around the 7th century.

Main periods 

 Middle Jōmon (3520–2470 BCE): 
Katsusaka/Otamadai
Kasori E1
 Kasori E2
 Late Jōmon (2470–1250 BCE): 
Horinouchi
 Kasori B2,
Angyo 1
 Final Jōmon (1250–500 BCE): 
 Tohoku District
Oubora B
 Oubora BC (Ōfunato, Iwate)
 Oubora C1
 Oubora C2
 Oubora A
 Oubora A'
 Kanto District
 Angyo 2 (Kawaguchi, Saitama)
 Angyo 3

Population decline 
At the end of the Jōmon period the local population declined sharply. Scientists suggest that this was possibly caused by food shortages and other environmental problems. They concluded that not all Jōmon groups suffered under these circumstances but the overall population declined. Examining the remains of the people who lived throughout the Jōmon period, there is evidence that these deaths were not inflicted by warfare or violence on a large enough scale to cause these deaths.

Foundation myths 
The origin myths of Japanese civilization extend back to periods now regarded as part of the Jōmon period, though they show little or no relation to the current archaeological understanding of Jōmon culture. February 11, 660 BC, is the traditional founding date of the Japanese nation by Emperor Jimmu. This version of Japanese history, however, comes from the country's first written records, the Kojiki and Nihon Shoki, dating from the 6th to the 8th centuries, after Japan had adopted Chinese characters (Go-on/Kan-on).

Some elements of modern Japanese culture may date from this period and reflect the influences of a mingled migration from the northern Asian continent and the southern Pacific areas and the local Jōmon peoples. Among these elements are the precursors to Shinto, marriage customs, architectural styles, and technological developments such as lacquerware, laminated bows called "yumi", and metalworking.

Origin and ethnogenesis

The relationship of Jōmon people to the modern Japanese (Yamato people), Ryukyuans, and Ainu is not well clarified. Morphological studies of dental variation and genetic studies suggest that the Jōmon people were rather diverse, while other studies of autosomes and immunoglobin alleles suggest that the Jōmon people were of predominantly Northeast Asian and Siberian origin. The contemporary Japanese people descended from a mixture of the various ancient hunter-gatherer tribes of the Jōmon period and the Yayoi rice-agriculturalists, and these two major ancestral groups came to Japan over different routes at different times.

The Jōmon people were not one homogenous ethnic group. According to Mitsuru Sakitani the Jōmon people are an admixture of several Paleolithic populations. He suggests that Y-chromosome haplogroups C1a1 and D-M55 are two of the Jōmon lineages.

According to study “Jōmon culture and the peopling of the Japanese archipelago” by Schmidt and Seguchi (2014), the prehistoric Jōmon people descended from diverse paleolithic populations with multiple migrations into Jōmon-period Japan. They concluded: "In this respect, the biological identity of the Jomon is heterogeneous, and it may be indicative of diverse peoples who possibly belonged to a common culture, known as the Jomon".

A study by Lee and Hasegawa of the Waseda University, concluded that the Jōmon period population of Hokkaido consisted of two distinctive populations, which later merged to form the proto-Ainu in northern Hokkaido. The Ainu language can be connected to an "Okhotsk component" which spread southwards. They further concluded that the "dual structure theory" regarding the population history of Japan must be revised and that the Jōmon people had more diversity than originally suggested.

A 2015 study found specific gene alleles, related to facial structure and features among some Ainu individuals, which largely descended from local Hokkaido Jōmon groups. These alleles are typically associated with Europeans but absent from other East Asians (including Japanese people), which suggests geneflow from a currently unidentified source population into the Jōmon period population of Hokkaido. Although these specific alleles can explain the unusual physical appearance of certain Ainu individuals, compared to other Northeast Asians, the exact origin of these alleles remains unknown.

Recent Y chromosome haplotype testing indicates that male haplogroups D-M55 (~30%) and C1a1 (5.4%) may reflect paternal Jōmon contribution to the modern Japanese Archipelago. Analysis of the mitochondrial DNA (mtDNA) of Jōmon skeletons indicates that haplogroups N9b, D4h2, G1b and M7a may reflect maternal Jōmon contribution to the modern Japanese mtDNA pool.

Full genome analyses in 2020 and 2021 revealed further information regarding the origin of the Jōmon peoples. The genetic results suggest early admixture between different groups in Japan already during the Paleolithic, followed by constant geneflow from coastal East Asian groups, resulting in a heterogeneous population which then homogenized until the arrival of the Yayoi people. Geneflow from Northeast Asia during the Jōmon period is associated with the C1a1 and C2 lineages, geneflow from the Tibetan Plateau and Southern China is associated with the D1a2a (previously D1b) and D1a1 (previously D1a) lineages. Geneflow from ancient Siberia was also detected into the northern Jōmon people of Hokkaido, with later geneflow from Hokkaido into parts of northern Honshu (Tohoku). The lineages K and F are suggested to have been presented during the early Jōmon period but got replaced by C and D. The analysis of a Jōmon sample (Ikawazu) and an ancient sample from the Tibetan Plateau (Chokhopani, Ch) found only partially shared ancestry, pointing towards a "positive genetic bottleneck" regarding the spread of haplogroup D from ancient "East Asian Highlanders" (related to modern day Tujia people, Mien people, and Tibetans, as well as Tripuri people). The genetic evidence suggests that an East Asian source population, near the Himalayan mountain range, contributed ancestry to the Jōmon period population of Japan, and less to ancient Southeast Asians. The authors concluded that this points to an inland migration through southern or central China towards Japan during the Paleolithic. Another ancestry component seem to have arrived from Siberia into Hokkaido. Archeological and biological evidence link the southern Jōmon culture of Kyushu, Shikoku and parts of Honshu to cultures of southern China and Northeast India. A common culture, known as the "broadleafed evergreen forest culture", ranged from southwestern Japan through southern China towards Northeast India and southern Tibet, and was characterized by the cultivation of Azuki beans.

Some linguists suggest that the Japonic languages were already present within the Japanese archipelago and coastal Korea, before the Yayoi period, and can be linked to one of the Jōmon populations of southwestern Japan, rather than the later Yayoi or Kofun period rice-agriculturalists. Japonic-speakers then expanded during the Yayoi period, assimilating the newcomers, adopting rice-agriculture, and fusing mainland Asian technologies with local traditions.

Vovin (2021) presented arguments for the presence of Austronesian peoples within the Japanese archipelago during the Jōmon period, based on previous linguistic, and specific Austronesian vocabulary loaned into the core vocabulary of (Insular) Japanese. He suggests that Austronesian-speakers arrived in Japan during the Jōmon period and prior to the arrival of Yayoi period migrants, associated with the spread of Japonic languages. These Austronesian-speakers were subsequently assimilated into the Japanese ethnicity. Evidence for non-Ainuic, non-Austronesian, and non-Korean loanwords are found among Insular Japonic languages, and probably derived from unknown and extinct Jōmon languages.

Cultural revival 
The modern public perception of the Jōmon has gradually changed from primitive and obsolete to captivating. In the early 21st century, the Jōmon cord markings was revived and used on clothing, accessories and tattoos. Archaeologist Jun Takayama theorizes that the patterns on Dogū depicted tattoos. In the 1970s a movement started to reproduce the ancient techniques of Jomon-style ceramics. Contemporary Jōmon pottery is based on Jōmon-style ceramics and earthenware that has been replicated with ancient techniques such as a bonfire. The motifs of Jōmon artifacts are used as inspiration for vessels and e.g. origami, cookies, candies, notebooks and neckties. In 2018, a Jōmon exhibition at the Tokyo National Museum had 350,000 visitors which was 3.5 times more than expected. Jomon-style pit houses have been recreated in places such as the Jomon Village Historic Garden. Magazines such as Jomonzine cover the prehistoric period.

Gallery

See also 

 Comb Ceramic
 Koshintō
 Prehistoric Asia
 Unofficial nengō system (私年号)
 Yayoi period

Footnotes

References

References 
 Aikens, C. Melvin, and Takayasu Higuchi. (1982). Prehistory of Japan. Studies in Archaeology. New York: Academic Press. (main text 337 pages; Jomon text 92 pages) 
 
 
 
 Habu, Junko, "Subsistence-Settlement systems in intersite variability in the Moroiso Phase of the Early Jomon Period of Japan"
 Hudson, Mark J., Ruins of Identity: Ethnogenesis in the Japanese Islands, University of Hawai`i Press, 1999, 
 Imamura, Keiji, Prehistoric Japan, University of Hawai`i Press, 1996, 
 Kobayashi, Tatsuo. (2004). Jomon Reflections: Forager Life and Culture in the Prehistoric Japanese Archipelago. Ed. Simon Kaner with Oki Nakamura. Oxford, England: Oxbow Books. (main text 186 pages, all on Jomon) 
 Koyama, Shuzo, and David Hurst Thomas (eds.). (1979). Affluent Foragers: Pacific Coasts East and West. Senri Ethnological Studies No. 9. Osaka: National Museum of Ethnology.
 Mason, Penelope E., with Donald Dinwiddie, History of Japanese art, 2nd edn 2005, Pearson Prentice Hall, 9780131176027
 Michael, Henry N., "The Neolithic Age in Eastern Siberia." Henry N. Michael. Transactions of the American Philosophical Society, New Ser., Vol. 48, No. 2 (1958), pp. 1–108. (laminated bow from Korekawa, Aomori)
 Mizoguchi, Koji, An Archaeological History of Japan: 10,000 B.C. to A.D. 700, University of Pennsylvania Press, 2002, 
 Pearson, Richard J., Gina Lee Barnes, and Karl L. Hutterer (eds.). (1986). Windows on the Japanese Past: Studies in Archaeology and Prehistory. Ann Arbor, Michigan: Center for Japanese Studies, The University of Michigan. (main text 496 pages; Jomon text 92 pages)

External links 

 BBC audio file (15 minutes). Discussion of Jomon pots. A History of the World in 100 Objects.
 Department of Asian Art. "Jomon Culture (ca. 10,500–ca. 300 B.C.)". In Heilbrunn Timeline of Art History. New York: The Metropolitan Museum of Art, 2000–. (October 2002)
 Comprehensive Database of Archaeological Site Reports in Japan, the Nara National Research Institute for Cultural Properties.
 Memory of the Jomon Period by The University Museum, The University of Tokyo
 The Prehistoric Archaeology of Japan by the Niigata Prefectural Museum of History
 Chronologies of the Jomon Period
 Jomon Culture by Professor Charles T Keally
 Yayoi Culture by Professor Charles T Keally
 The life of Jomon people, Tamagawa  University

 
Japanese eras
Ancient Japan
Ainu history
Ancient peoples
Archaeological cultures of East Asia
Archaeology of Japan
14th-century BC establishments
5th-century BC disestablishments
5th century BC
6th century BC
7th century BC
8th century BC
9th century BC
10th century BC
11th century BC
12th century BC
13th century BC
14th century BC